Alonim (lit. Oaks) is a kibbutz in northern Israel. Located in the Lower Galilee, it falls under the jurisdiction of Jezreel Valley Regional Council.

History

Ottoman era
In the Ottoman era, a village called Qusqus, or Kuskus, was situated here. In 1859, the population was given as 100, with 16 feddans of tillage.

In 1875, Victor Guérin visited, and  estimated that the village had 200 inhabitants. In 1881, the PEF's  Survey of Western Palestine described  Kuskus as an adobe village in the oak-woods on high ground.

British Mandate era
In 1925 a Zionist organisation purchased 30 feddans in Kiskis (present Alonim) and Tabon (present Kiryat Tiv'on) from the Sursuk family of Beirut. At the time, there were 36 families living there. From 1931, and lasting several years, the Jewish Agency struggled to evict the tenant farmers from Qusqus, from the land which was to become Alonim.

The kibbutz was established on 26 June 1938 as part of the tower and stockade settlement project.

During the 1936–39 Arab revolt in Palestine, Alonim was frequently attacked and three of its members were killed. It began as an orchard and dairy farm, and manufactured flutes, which were popular with Israeli children.

By 1945, al Tivon (Alonim) (previously Qusqus Taboun) had 370 Muslim and 320 Jewish inhabitants, with a total land area of 5,823 dunams. Of this land, 141 dunams were used for plantations and irrigable land, 2,038 for cereals, while 3,644 dunams were classified as non-cultivable land.

In 1947, Alonim had a population of over 450.

State of Israel
The Israel National Arabian Horse Show is an annual event held at Kibbutz Alonim. As one of its economic branches, the kibbutz operates chicken coops in partnership with Kibbutz Hannaton.

References

Bibliography

External links
Kibbutz website 
Survey of Western Palestine, Map 5:    IAA, Wikimedia commons

Kibbutzim
Kibbutz Movement
Populated places established in 1938
Jewish villages in Mandatory Palestine
Populated places in Northern District (Israel)